Pierre Danet (1650 in Paris – 1709) was a French cleric, Latinist, Hellenist, Romanist and lexicographer.

In 1668, Danet was appointed in the editorial team of expenditure ad usum Delphini by Charles de Sainte-Maure, Duke of Montausier (1610-1690), the tutor of Louis, Grand Dauphin

In 1673, he became Magister Petrus Daneticus academicus, and from 1677 Petrus Danetius Academicus, abbas Sancti Nicolai Virdunensis (abbot of Saint-Nicolas in Verdun).

In the 18th century, Pierre Danet's dictionary experienced numerous editions and adaptations and served as the basis for multiple dictionaries with European languages.

Works 
Dictionarium novum latinum et gallicum, Paris 1673, 1680; Magnum Dictionarium latino-gallicum, Paris 1691, 1696, 1704, Lyon 1708, 1712, 1726, 1739, Amsterdam 1711
Nouveau Dictionnaire françois et latin, enrichi des meilleures façons de parler en l'une et l'autre langue, composé par l'ordre du Roy pour Monseigneur le Dauphin, Paris 1683, 1687, 1700, 1707; Grand dictionnaire français et latin, Amsterdam 1710, Lyon 1713, 1721, 1735, 1737, Toulouse 1731, 1754, Paris 1972
Radices seu dictionarium linguae latinae in quo singulae voces suis radicibus subjiciuntur, Paris 1677
 Dictionarium antiquitatum romanarum et graecarum, Paris 1698, Amsterdam 1701

Bibliography 
Franz Josef Hausmann: Sprachwissenschaft im Wörterbuchvorwort.

External links 
 Pierre Danet on data.bnf.fr
 

Romance philologists
French lexicographers
French hellenists
17th-century French Roman Catholic priests
Writers from Paris
1650 births
1709 deaths